Son Seung-won (born June 29, 1990) is a South Korean actor. He is most active in musical theatre, and was the youngest Korean actor cast in the leading role in the Korean staging of Hedwig and the Angry Inch in 2013.

He is known for his role in the television series Hello, My Twenties! and Welcome to Waikiki.

DUI and imprisonment 

In April 2019, Son was sentenced to one year and six months in prison, forfeiting his military service. His acting career has come to an end after this incident. Son was released from prison in May 2020.

Filmography

Television series

Film

Musical theatre

References

External links 
 Son Seung-won at Blossom Entertainment 
 

1990 births
Living people
South Korean male musical theatre actors
South Korean male television actors
South Korean male film actors
Seoul Institute of the Arts alumni